Adam Cohen may refer to:

 Adam Cohen (journalist) (born c.1962), American journalist at The New York Times
 Adam Cohen (musician) (born 1972), Canadian born musician, the son of Leonard Cohen
 Adam Cohen (scientist) (born 1979), associate professor of chemistry and chemical biology and of physics at Harvard University